Brage may refer to:

 Another name for Norse god Bragi
 Brage (given name), a Norwegian masculine given name
 Brage Prize, an annual Norwegian literary award.
 IK Brage, a Swedish football club located in Borlänge
 Brage oil field, operated by Wintershall Norge, located off the coast of Norway
 HNoMS Brage, two ships in the Royal Norwegian Navy:
 HNoMS Brage (1878), Vale-class gunboat
 HNoMS Brage (N49), Auk-class minesweeper